Evgeni Yurevich Ryabchikov (born January 16, 1974) is a Russian former professional ice hockey goaltender. He was drafted in the first round, 21st overall, by the Boston Bruins in the 1994 NHL Entry Draft. He was named to the tournament all-star team of the 1994 World Junior Ice Hockey Championships. He never played in the National Hockey League, however.

Career statistics

Regular season and playoffs

International statistics

External links

1974 births
Boston Bruins draft picks
Charlotte Checkers (1993–2010) players
Dayton Bombers players
Erie Panthers players
Huntington Blizzard players
HC Lada Togliatti players
Metallurg Magnitogorsk players
Krylya Sovetov Moscow players
Living people
National Hockey League first-round draft picks
Odessa Jackalopes players
Providence Bruins players
Russian ice hockey goaltenders
Waco Wizards players
Sportspeople from Yaroslavl